Lamlang (also Romanized as Lāmlang; also known as Lālang) is a village in Anjirabad Rural District, in the Central District of Gorgan County, Golestan Province, Iran. The 2006 census found its population was 558 people, in 137 families.

References 

Populated places in Gorgan County